The Chieftain is a 1984 Norwegian drama film directed by Terje Kristiansen. The film was selected as the Norwegian entry for the Best Foreign Language Film at the 57th Academy Awards, but was not accepted as a nominee.

Cast
 Terje Kristiansen as Arne Strømberg
 Vibeke Løkkeberg as Eva
 Tonje Kleivdal Kristiansen as Turid
 Eva von Hanno as Toril
 Klaus Hagerup as Tom
 Arne Hestenes as Sjefen
 Sverre Anker Ousdal as Harald Ås
 Sigbjørn Bernhoft Osa as Bestefar

See also
 List of submissions to the 57th Academy Awards for Best Foreign Language Film
 List of Norwegian submissions for the Academy Award for Best Foreign Language Film

References

External links
 

1984 films
1984 drama films
Norwegian drama films
1980s Norwegian-language films